Matej Poliak (born 19 January 1993) is a Slovak judoka. He is the 2017 European bronze medalist in the 66 kg division.

References

External links
 

1993 births
Slovak male judoka
Living people
European Games competitors for Slovakia
Judoka at the 2019 European Games